Jacob Berend "Jaap" Bakema (8 March 1914 – 20 February 1981) was a Dutch modernist architect, notable for design of public housing and involvement in the reconstruction of Rotterdam after the Second World War.

Born in Groningen, Bakema studied at the Groningen Higher Technical College (1931–1936) and the Academy of Architecture in Amsterdam, where he studied among others with Mart Stam. In 1946 he began attending meetings of the Congrès International d'Architecture Moderne, became its Secretary in 1955, and was a core member of its offshoot Team 10.

From 1948 onward, Bakema worked with Jo van den Broek in the architectural firm Van den Broek and Bakema. They collaborated to design landmarks and neighborhoods in Rotterdam and around the Netherlands, and participated in the 1957 Interbau project in Berlin.

In 1964 Bakema became a professor at Delft University of Technology, and in 1965 became a professor at Staatliche Hochschule in Hamburg.

References
 Jaap Bakema. team10online.org

External links

1914 births
1981 deaths
Modernist architects
Structuralists
People from Groningen (city)
Academic staff of the Delft University of Technology
Congrès International d'Architecture Moderne members
20th-century Dutch architects